Arhan Isuf (Bulgarian: Архан Исуф; born 25 January 1999) is a Bulgarian professional footballer who plays as a defender for Hebar Pazardzhik.

Career

Lokomotiv Plovdiv
On 17 May 2015 Isuf was set on bench in the league match against Marek Dupnitsa, but stayed as unused substitute. He completed his professional debut on 26 November 2017 in a league match against CSKA Sofia. Two days later he signed his first professional contract with Lokomotiv until June 2020.

Loan to Arda
On 8 June 2018 Isuf was sent on loan to the Second League team Arda Kardzhali for the 2018–19 season.

Career statistics

Club

References

External links
 

1999 births
Living people
Footballers from Plovdiv
Bulgarian footballers
Bulgaria youth international footballers
Association football fullbacks
PFC Lokomotiv Plovdiv players
FC Arda Kardzhali players
PFC Spartak Varna players
OFC Pirin Blagoevgrad players
First Professional Football League (Bulgaria) players
Second Professional Football League (Bulgaria) players
Bulgarian people of Turkish descent